Aftab Uddin Bhuiyan was an Awami League politician and the former Member of Parliament of Dhaka-24.

Career
Bhuiyan was elected to parliament from Dhaka-24 as an Awami League candidate in 1973.

Death
Bhuiyan died on 6 October 1995.

References

Awami League politicians
1995 deaths
1st Jatiya Sangsad members